A natural turn is a dance step in which the partners turn around each other clockwise. Its near-mirror counterpart is the reverse turn, which is turning to the counter-clockwise.

This terminology is used mainly in the "International Standard" group of ballroom dances. "Natural turn" and "reverse turn" are names of syllabus figures in waltz, Viennese waltz, foxtrot, quickstep. In addition, the words "natural" and "reverse" are used in some other figures that amount to turning to the right or left, respectively, e.g. natural twist turn in tango and foxtrot.

The name "natural" has two explanations. In a standard ballroom closed dance position the partners are somewhat shifted to the left with respect to each other, which makes the right turn easier. The second reason is related to progress around the floor along the counter-clockwise line of dance. Turning to the right is partly compensated for by the line of dance's leftward curve, so that it takes less effort to stay on line of dance while turning to the right than while using opposite footwork and turning to the left, especially at the corners.

Natural turn
Leader (man)

Follower (lady)

Other "natural" figures

Reverse turn
Leader (man)

Follower (lady)

Other "reverse" figures

References

External links
  (natural turn at 1:07 and reverse turn at 2:13)

Social dance steps